Parapolystichum munitum, synonym Lastreopsis munita, the naked shield fern is a plant found in tropical and subtropical forest areas in eastern Australia. Often seen in large colonies, near streams in rainforest and wet eucalyptus areas, north from the Barrington Tops.

References

Dryopteridaceae
Flora of New South Wales
Flora of Queensland
Plants described in 1858